Remembrance Day (Marshall Islands), formally known as Nuclear Victims' Day and Nuclear Survivors' Day,  occurs on March 1 and is a national holiday in the Marshall Islands. The day honors the victims and survivors of nuclear testing done in the area in the 1950s.

Castle Bravo was the code name given to the first U.S. test of a dry fuel thermonuclear hydrogen bomb device, detonated on March 1, 1954 at Bikini Atoll, Marshall Islands, as the first test of Operation Castle. Fallout from the detonation poisoned the islanders who had previously inhabited the atoll.

See also 
 Operation Crossroads
 Bikini Atoll

References

External links
Nuclear Victims and Survivors Remembrance Day
Remembrance Day

March observances
Public holidays in the Marshall Islands